This is a list of lighthouses in Guinea.

Lighthouses

See also
List of lighthouses in Guinea-Bissau (to the north)
List of lighthouses in Sierra Leone (to the south)
 Lists of lighthouses and lightvessels

References

External links

Guinea

Lighthouses
Lighthouses